Kjwan is a Filipino hard rock band formed in 2003 by former Sandwich guitarist and lead vocalist Marc Abaya and Dicta License bassist Kelley Mangahas.

History
Long-time friends and former high school bandmates Marc Abaya (vocals) and Kelley Mangahas (bass) got together with fellow Ateneans Jorel Corpus (guitar) and J-hoon Balbuena (drums) to form the band's initial lineup. In 2004, Boogie Romero (guitar), another high school friend and former bandmate of Marc and Kelley, joined the lineup. They released their self-titled debut album in 2004 with their carrier hit single “Daliri” which gained constant airplay on radio stations and television.

Kjwan released their second album, 2StepMarv three years later under Barnyard Music. 
 
The band won Favorite Indie Artist in the local music channel MYX’s music awards night. Their video “Pintura” nabbed “Favorite Guest Appearance” with the help of a seasoned actress, Chin-Chin Gutierrez. They were also featured for a month on MTV Pilipinas in December 2006. They enjoyed a month-long feature as Yahoo Southeast Asia's band of the month and another month-long feature as “Celebrity VJs” in MYX for the whole month of April 2006. They also got nominated in 6 categories in the 2007 NU Rock Awards for Artist of the Year, Best Live Act, Album of the Year, Producer of the Year (with Angee Rozul), Vocalist of the Year (Marc Abaya) and Guitarist of the Year (Boogie Romero). 2Step Marv was a massive success for the band as they cemented themselves with releases that included: Pintura, Sa Ilalim, Shai, Invitation and One Look.

At this time, the band also had the chance to show what Philippine rock is made of to various countries abroad. They headlined HK-Live, in Central, HK back in October 2007 in front of a packed Fringe Club with fans from many different nationalities. HK-Live is a monthly showcase of the Hottest Acts around Asia in HK's Fringe Club. They were also part of the Annual Baybeats Music Festival in Singapore and the HUSH Music Festival in Macau, China.

One of their biggest breakthroughs was winning the grand prize in the Asian and Philippine leg in IKON ASEAN Competition. Held in Putrajaya, Malaysia and watched by hundreds of thousands all over the region, their performance made an impact to the Asian Music Community. Kjwan beat thirty other bands from both the Philippines and in South East Asia.

Kjwan released their third album entitled 13 Seconds to Love. Inspired by the fact that a great song can be determined in just thirteen seconds, the band brought this along in their song writing with love as the common theme. The album was also the first one that was released first on a purely digital format when it was preloaded in official releases of Nokia 5800 XpressMusic in the Philippines, six months before the actual physical release of the album.

Band members

Current members
Marc Abaya – lead vocals, rhythm and lead guitar (2003–present)
Kelley Mangahas – bass guitar (2003–present)
Boogie Romero – lead guitar, co-lead & backing vocals (2004–present)
Inky de Dios – keyboards, keytar, synthesizers, percussion, backing vocals (2011–present)
Eo Marcos – drums (2012–present)

Former members
Marinito "J-Hoon" Balbuena – drums, backing vocals (2003–2009)
Jorel Corpus – guitars, percussion, backing vocals (2003–2009)
Pao Santiago – drums (2010–2012)

Session musicians
Bryan Makasiar – drums
Wendell Garcia – drums
Paolo Manuel - drums

Discography
Studio Albums

Other Appearances

Awards and achievements

Miscellaneous and Other Awards:
Ani ng Dangal Award from The Office of the President and The National Commission for Culture and the Arts(NCCA)

References

External links
Official website
Kjwan on MySpace Music

Filipino rock music groups
MCA Music Inc. (Philippines) artists
Musical groups from Metro Manila
Musical groups established in 2003
Sony Music Philippines artists